Edward Dickinson Duffield (March 31, 1871 – September 18, 1938) was an American politician, banker, and acting President of Princeton University following the retirement of John G. Hibben. Duffield served in the New Jersey Assembly from 1904 to 1905 and later became president of Prudential Insurance Company of America. He also acted as chairman of the board of trustees for Princeton University; he died from heart disease.

Early life and education 
Duffield was born on March 31, 1871 in Princeton to James Thomas Duffield, a Princeton professor, and Sarah Green Duffield. He is a direct descendant of Jonathan Dickinson. He attended Princeton Preparatory School in Lawrenceville. Duffield graduated from Princeton University in 1892, received his J.D. degree from New York University School of Law in 1894, and earned a Master of Arts from Princeton in 1895.

Career 
Duffield became president of Prudential Insurance Company of America in 1922. Following the retirement of John Grier Hibben, Duffield became acting president of Princeton University from 1932 to 1933.

Death 
Duffield died from heart disease in South Orange.

References 

1871 births
1938 deaths
Presidents of Princeton University
Princeton University alumni
American bankers
People from Princeton, New Jersey